George K. Kollitides II is a U.S. private equity and operations executive with a focus on government and business services, light industrial and consumer industries.   He has served as the chairman, CEO and president or lead director of public, private and non-profit companies and organizations, including as a member or chair of compensation and audit committees.

Education 
Kollitides received an MBA in Finance and Management of Organizations from Columbia Business School in 1998 and a BA in Economics with a minor in Government and Law from Lafayette College in 1991.

Professional career

Kollitides started his career at General Electric Capital, where he worked in Corporate Finance, Restructuring and Private Equity. After attending Columbia Business School, he became a principal at Catterton Partners, a global consumer and retail-focused private equity firm. He then went on to co-found TenX Capital Management, a private equity firm. Kollitides and the TenX team eventually joined Cerberus Capital Management LP, a global institutional investment management firm.   

Kollitides is currently a partner and co-head of A&M Capital Opportunities, a middle-market private equity firm, where he sits on the Investment and Conflicts committees.  He also sits on the boards of Worldwise, Inc., a growing pet product company, Frontier Dermatology, LLC, the largest dermatology practice in the Pacific Northwest and the fifth largest in the U.S., adMarketplace, a search advertiser, and Precision Aero Gear Group, LLC, a manufacturer of critical gears for aerospace and defense.

Clubs and associations

Kollitides is an active member of the Young Presidents Gold Organization (YPO Gold) and also serves on the Advancement Committee of the Institute for the Study of War. 

Kollitides previously served on the Lafayette College Trustees’ Financial Policy Committee, as the vice chairman of the Orthopedic Foundation for Active Lifestyles, a director of Good Sports New York Advisory Board, a Trustee of the Bridgeport Hospital Foundation, a board member of DOMUS, a residential program for vulnerable Connecticut youth, and as a volunteer fireman for 10 years.

Awards and recognitions

Kollitides was ranked by Sports One Source as one of 40 under 40 in the sporting goods industry.  Kollitides was also honored with the Orthopedic Foundation for Active Lifestyles 2010 Philanthropy Leadership Award.

References

 Orthopaedic Foundation
 Sports One Source
 Professional work

External links
George K. Kollitides, II biography Aegis Capital Advisors LLC, Investment team
George K. Kollitides, II biography A&M Capital Opportunities
George K. Kollitides, II biography Tomahawk Strategic Solutions

People from New York (state)
American people of Greek descent
Columbia Business School alumni
Lafayette College alumni
Living people
Lafayette College trustees
Year of birth missing (living people)